Bamboo Chen Chu-sheng (Pe̍h-ōe-jī: Tân Tek-seng; born 6 August 1975) is a Taiwanese actor, acting coach and producer. He is best known for his roles in Zone Pro Site, The Great Buddha + and Alifu, the Prince/ss.

Personal life
Chen is married with 2 daughters.

Filmography

As actor

Film

Television series

As production crew

Theater

Awards and nominations

References

External links

1975 births
Living people
21st-century Taiwanese male actors
Taiwanese acting coaches
Taiwanese male film actors
Taiwanese male television actors
Taiwanese male stage actors
Male actors from New Taipei